Makrani (also known as Lotuni, Zadgaali, or Junoobi) is variety of the Balochi language spoken in the historical region of Makran in Balochistan in Pakistan as well as Iran.  Spoken by the Makrani people, it is often categorised as an "important" dialect of Balochi.  Makrani uses many loanwords especially from Sindhi, Urdu, and Persian.  Some people consider Makrani a mix of Balochi and Sindhi.  Makrani includes four dialects, Coastal, Lashari, Kechi, and Karachi.  The Karachi dialect is spoken in Karachi.  Makrani is the second most spoken Balochi dialect after Rakhshani in Iranian Balochistan.

Loanwords 
Makrani is notable for being filled with loanwords from other languages.  This is primarily seen in Sindhi, while also Persian, Urdu, and Arabic.  Loanwords from Urdu is rather new due to the creation of Pakistan.  Sindhi has been one of the main languages that Makrani uses for loanwords primarily because of the contact between Lasi speakers.  The Makrani dialect also uses loanwords from the now extinct Sidi language, which was considered a variety of Swahili.

References  

Western Iranian languages